"Person of interest" is a term used by law enforcement in the United States, Canada, and other countries when identifying someone possibly involved in a criminal investigation who has not been arrested or formally accused of a crime. It has no legal meaning, but refers to someone in whom the police are "interested", either because the person is cooperating with the investigation, may have information that would assist the investigation, or possesses certain characteristics that merit further attention.

While terms such as suspect, target, and material witness have clear and sometimes formal definitions, person of interest remains undefined by the U.S. Department of Justice. Unsub is a similar term which is short for "unknown subject" (used in the TV show Criminal Minds). Person of interest is usually used as a euphemism for suspect, and its careless use may encourage trials by media. 

With respect to terrorism investigations, Eric Lichtblau wrote in the New York Times: "Law enforcement officials say that the term simply reflects the new tactics required to fight terrorism. But some legal scholars say officials are trying to create a more benign public image, even as their power expands."

History
This phrase was first utilized by law enforcement in 1986, during the investigation of the Green River Killer. It was coined by Fae Brooks, a member of the King County Sheriff's Department at the time of the investigation.

According to Eric Lichtbau in The New York Times:

The term was used widely in mass media at least as early as the 1996 Atlanta Olympics bombing in reference to Richard A. Jewell. Its initial uses aroused controversy, but it has since seen increasingly regular use. Jewell later remarked on the use of the term:

Hatfill v. Ashcroft
The use of the term became widely critiqued when United States Attorney General John Ashcroft used it in a press conference when asked if Dr. Steven J. Hatfill was a suspect in the 2001 anthrax attacks case. In 2002, Hatfill's attorney filed a complaint with the Justice Department's Office of Professional Responsibility, arguing that "the term is not recognized in law or criminal procedure and that Ashcroft did not have the right 'to preside over the public shredding of [Hatfill's] life. This is un-American. Mr. Ashcroft owes Dr. Hatfill an apology. Hatfill sued the Department of Justice for violation of federal privacy law; the case was settled in 2008 for $5.8 million.

Definition
Normal Justice Department parlance for subjects of investigation includes "suspect", "subject" and "target". Each has specific meanings relevant to different levels of investigation. Senator Chuck Grassley, Republican of Iowa, wrote to the Attorney General for clarification of the unfamiliar phrase in September 2002. In December of that year, Nuclear Threat Initiative's Global Security Newswire summarized the response as follows:

See also
 Targeted surveillance

References

2001 anthrax attacks
Criminal investigation
Euphemisms
Legal terminology